The 8th Asia Pacific Screen Awards were held in Brisbane, Australia on 11 December 2014.

Awards

Films and countries with multiple nominations

References

Asia Pacific Screen Awards
Asia Pacific Screen Awards
Asia Pacific Screen Awards
Asia Pacific Screen Awards